Kotougouni is a village in the Sidéradougou Department of Comoé Province in south-western Burkina Faso. The village has a population of 621.

References

Populated places in the Cascades Region
Comoé Province